Arthur Arntzen may refer to:
 Arthur Arntzen (politician) (1906–1997), Norwegian politician
 Arthur Arntzen (humorist) (born 1937), Norwegian humorist